The African Minifootball Cup (AMC) is a continental indoor minifootball competition contested by the senior men's national teams of African Minifootball Federation (AMF). The first edition was held in Libya in May 2018.

History
Between 2–3 March 2018, the African Minifootball general assembly was held in Tunisia as the momentum for minifootball continued to build throughout the continent. The 2018 calendar was set and it was decided that the African Cup would start in May, serving as qualifying tournament for the 2019 WMF World Cup.

Results

Medal table

Participating nations
Legend

 – Champions
 – Runners-up
 – Third place
 – Fourth place

QF – Quarter Finals
GS – Group stage
q – Qualified
x - Did not enter 
 — Hosts

References

External links
 African Minifootball Confederation 
African Minifootball Champions League

 
Minifootball  
International association football competitions in Africa
African championships
Recurring sporting events established in 2018
2018 establishments in Africa